Sir Stephen Edward De Vere, 4th Baronet (26 July 1812 – 10 November 1904) was an Anglo-Irish Member of Parliament in the nineteenth century.

Life
He was the second son of Sir Aubrey de Vere, 2nd Baronet and Mary Spring Rice, and elder brother of the poet Aubrey Thomas de Vere. He had three sisters, although only one, Elinor, survived until adulthood. De Vere's other siblings were; Horatio, William and Vere Edmond.

In 1847, he took passage in one of the infamous "coffin ships" that transported Irish emigrants fleeing the Great Famine to British North America and the United States, wanting to see for himself the horrendous conditions that were leading to the deaths of so many of these passengers. He composed a withering report on his voyage now contained within The Elgin-Grey Papers. When Colonial Secretary Earl Grey read this report, he forwarded it to Lord Elgin, Governor-General of Upper Canada and Lower Canada in the hope that these inhumane conditions could be improved. The Passenger Act of 1847 made "coffin ships" illegal, though many still operated.
 
De Vere became a Roman Catholic in 1847, and defended the re-creation of the English Catholic hierarchy in 1851. He was a Whig Party MP for Limerick County from 1854 to 1859, and was appointed High Sheriff of County Limerick in 1870.

Stephen Edward became 4th Baronet De Vere of Curragh in 1880 when his oldest brother, Vere Edmond, the 3rd Baronet, died with no male heir. With the title, Stephen inherited the Curraghchase Forest Park estate, in County Limerick. There he wrote poems, political pamphlets and translated several editions of the works of Horace, considered by some as the best English translation of Horace's verses.

He built a Gothic church in Foynes, and is buried beside it. On his death in 1904 the baronetcy became extinct. He never married and his estate, together with that of his unmarried brother Aubrey, went to their nephew Aubrey Vere O'Brien, while the Foynes Island farm went to their other nephew, Robert Vere O'Brien.

References

External links 
 

Stephen de Vere in 'Writers - Non-Fiction' file at Limerick City Library, Ireland

1812 births
1904 deaths
19th-century Anglo-Irish people
Baronets in the Baronetage of Ireland
Stephen
Members of the Parliament of the United Kingdom for County Limerick constituencies (1801–1922)
Nobility from County Limerick
UK MPs 1852–1857
UK MPs 1857–1859
Converts to Roman Catholicism
High Sheriffs of County Limerick
Whig (British political party) MPs for Irish constituencies